The 1956 Volta a Catalunya was the 36th edition of the Volta a Catalunya cycle race and was held from 6 September to 13 September 1956. The race started in Sabadell and finished in Barcelona. The race was won by Aniceto Utset.

General classification

References

1956
Volta
1956 in Spanish road cycling
September 1956 sports events in Europe